The 1955–56 Liga Leumit season was the first edition of Liga Leumit, which had replaced Liga Alef as the top division of football in Israel and the 17th season of top flight football under the IFA.

Maccabi Tel Aviv won the title. Avraham Levi from Beitar Tel Aviv and Michael Michaelov from Hapoel Tel Aviv were the league's joint top scorers with 16 goals each.

Hapoel Kfar Saba and Maccabi Rehovot were relegated automatically, whilst Maccabi Jaffa finished third from bottom and entered a promotion/relegation play-off with Liga Alef champions Hakoah Tel Aviv. Jaffa won 4-1 on aggregate and remained in Liga Leumit.

Teams

Final table

Results

Positions by round
The table lists the positions of teams after each week of matches. In order to preserve chronological evolvements, any postponed matches are not included to the round at which they were originally scheduled, but added to the full round they were played immediately afterwards. For example, if a match is scheduled for matchday 13, but then postponed and played between days 16 and 17, it will be added to the standings for day 17.

Top goalscorers

References
Israel - List of Final Tables RSSSF

Liga Leumit seasons
Israel
1955–56 in Israeli football leagues